Mabe is a community in Scott County, Virginia, United States, located about 5 miles from Duffield. Surrounded mostly by Jefferson National Forest, it is down stream from the head waters of Stock Creek, which flows through Natural Tunnel and eventually into the Clinch River.

Unincorporated communities in Scott County, Virginia
Unincorporated communities in Virginia